Bourbach-le-Bas is a commune in the Haut-Rhin department in Grand Est in north-eastern France.

Public Transportation
The town is served by the Glantzmann bus company on weekdays during the school year.

See also
 Communes of the Haut-Rhin department

References

External links

 Official town site (in French)

Communes of Haut-Rhin